Conor O'Callaghan (born 1968) is an Irish novelist and poet.

Biography
O'Callaghan was  born in Newry in 1968 and grew up in Dundalk. His first novel, Nothing on Earth, was published to acclaim in 2016 and was shortlisted for the Kerry Group Irish Novel of the Year. His second novel, We Are Not in the World, appeared in February 2021. He has also published five collections of poetry. His memoir Red Mist: Roy Keane and the Football Civil War (2004) is an account of Roy Keane's departure from the 2002 FIFA World Cup squad.

O'Callaghan is a former co-holder of the Heimbold Chair of Irish Studies at Villanova University. He is currently a senior lecturer at Lancaster University. He was awarded the 2007 Bess Hokin prize by Poetry magazine.

He lives in Sheffield with his wife, Mary Peace, a scholar of eighteenth century literature.

Fiction
Nothing on Earth (Doubleday, 2016)
We Are Not in the World (Doubleday, 2021)

Poetry
The History of Rain (Gallery Press, 1993)
Seatown (Gallery Press, 1999)
Fiction (Gallery Press, 2005)
The Server Room (Smithereens Press, 2013)
The Sun King (Gallery Press, 2013)
Live Streaming (Gallery Press, 2017)

Non-fiction
Red Mist: Roy Keane and the Football Civil War (Bloomsbury, 2004)

References

External links
 Eileen Battersby, "Nothing on Earth by Conor O’Callaghan: an original story, brilliantly told" (review), Irish Times, 28 May 2016.
 Justine Jordan, "Nothing on Earth by Conor O’Callaghan review – a disturbing, elusive debut", The Guardian, 15 July 2016.
 Nina Allan, "The New Folk Horror: Recent Work by Sarah Hall, Conor O’Callaghan, and Malcolm Devlin", LA Review of Books, 18 November 2017.
 Jarlath Killeen, "How Celtic Tiger’s death led to a Gothic revival", The Irish Times, 28 April 2017.
 Mary Morrissy, "Nothing on Earth: a kind of ghost story on a ghost estate", The Irish Times, 10 April 2017.
 Conor O'Callaghan's page at Wake Forest University Press
 Conor O'Callaghan's page at Poetry Foundation
 Conor O'Callaghan's The Server Room'' at Smithereens Press
 The Stinging Fly review of The Sun King

Irish poets
Irish male poets
21st-century Irish poets
1968 births
Living people
21st-century Irish male writers